The 1998 Romanian Open was a men's tennis tournament played on Clay in Bucharest, Romania that was part of the World Series of the 1998 ATP Tour. It was the sixth edition of the tournament and was held from 14 September until 21 September 1997. First-seeded Francisco Clavet won the singles title.

Finals

Singles

 Francisco Clavet defeated  Arnaud Di Pasquale, 6–4, 2–6, 7–5
 It was Clevet's 1st singles title of the year and the 6th of his career.

Doubles

 Andrei Pavel /  Gabriel Trifu defeated  George Cosac /  Dinu Pescariu, 7–6, 7–6

References

External links
 ITF tournament edition details

Romanian Open
Romanian Open
1998 in Romanian tennis
September 1998 sports events in Europe